The 2004 season was Santos Futebol Clube's ninety-eighth season in existence and the club's forty-fifth consecutive season in the top flight of Brazilian football.

Santos won the Campeonato Brasileiro title for the eighth time in history by beating Vasco da Gama 2–1 on the final day of the season.

They were knocked out of the Campeonato Paulista in the semi-finals after losing 3–7 on aggregate against São Caetano.

Santos also played the Copa Libertadores for the seventh time, losing 1–2 in the quarter-finals to the eventual winners Once Caldas.

Players

Squad information

Source: Terra Esportes

Appearances and goals

Transfers

In

Out

Competitions

Overview

Detailed overall summary

Campeonato Brasileiro

League table

Results summary

Results by round

Matches

Campeonato Paulista

Results summary

Group stage

Knockout stage

Quarter-final

Semi-finals

Copa Libertadores

Group stage

Knockout stage

Round of 16

Quarter-finals

Copa Sudamericana

First round

Second round

Third round

Quarter-finals

References

External links
Official Site 

2004
Santos F.C.